Shend or Shand may refer to:
 Shend, Razavi Khorasan
 Shend, Sistan and Baluchestan
 Shand, South Khorasan

For musician and podcaster The Shend see The Cravats and The Very Things